Scaptius cerdai is a moth in the family Erebidae. It was described by Hervé de Toulgoët in 1994. It is found in French Guiana.

References

Moths described in 1994
Phaegopterina